The Schallenberg government was sworn in as 34th Government of Austria on 11 October 2021.

When Sebastian Kurz announced his resignation on 9 October 2021, the Austrian People's Party proposed to continue the coalition with The Greens with Alexander Schallenberg as chancellor. The Schallenberg government was sworn in by the president Alexander Van der Bellen on 11 October 2021.

Composition 
The cabinet consists of:

See also 
Politics of Austria

Notes

References

2021 establishments in Austria
Cabinets established in 2021
Politics of Austria
Schallenberg
2020s in Austria